The Chakosi are an Akan people who trace their origin to an area in the Ivory Coast in a place they call Anou or Ano. Thus, they refer to themselves and their language as Anufo "people of Anu". They inhabit three countries: Ghana, Benin and Togo. As of 2003 they had a combined population of 137,600. Orale narrations had it that they were in Ghana and Togo not later than 18th century and they were warriors in nature and fought a couple of battles including the ones they helped the Gonja people and the Mamprusi in building the Mamprusi Kingdom. They have names like Amoin, Akisie (Agishie), Kouasi, Adjoah, Amlan (Amanna) Ouwe, Yao, Koffi, Afoueh, N'gisah all depicting names of the days Mueneh (Sunday), Cishe (Monday), Djore (Tuesday), Mana (Wednesday), Ohue (Thursday), Ya (Friday) and Fue (Saturday) Kwa Chakosi speak the Akan dialect Chakosi language.

History

Early 18th century
It appears that migrations in the early 18th century brought together Mande horsemen and their malams from the North and Akan peoples from the East.

Together with the indigenous Ndenyi people, they were amalgamated into one people with a mixed language and culture.

Mid 18th century
In the mid 18th century, a small band of mercenaries left Ano to the Upper West region, Upper East region, Northern region, and North East region The band consisted of Mande horsemen, Akan musket-toting foot soldiers, and some Muslim scholar amulet-makers. These groups provided the basis for a society divided into three classes or estates: Nobles, commoners and Muslims.

Eventually, the small army established a camp on the shores of the Oti River where the town of Mango in Togo stands today. Since they were warriors and not farmers, they made their living by conducting raids into the farming communities around them. This provided them with wives and slaves as well as foodstuffs and livestock. Eventually the people settled in the surrounding farming communities, and assimilation took place.

References

Sources
 Kirby, J.P. (1986) God, Shrines and Problem-Solving among the Anufo of Northern Ghana. Collectanea Instituti Anthropos, No. 34, Berlin: Dietrich Reimer Verlag, for Anthropos Institute, St. Augustin.

Akan